Miss Malaysia 1963, the first edition of the Miss World Malaysia pageant was held on 23 April 1963, at the Stadium Negara in Kuala Lumpur. 30 candidates from all across Federation, Singapore and Borneo were expected to compete but only 11 candidates were chosen to compete in the grand finale while the remainder will be taking part in a fashion tableau in conjunction of the contest.

Catherine Loh, representing Brunei was being elected as Miss Malaysia 1963. She was crowned by French actress Capucine at the end of the event. She had been “Miss Brunei” for three consecutive years.

Requirements 

 Any girls from any of the Malaysian territories are able to compete;
 Ages between 17 to 27 years old.

Results

Judges 

 Puan Rahah Mohamed Noah – Malaysian socialite and wife of Malaysian 2nd Prime Minister, Tun Abdul Razak Hussein
 Encik Mohamed Khir Johari – Minister of Agriculture & Co-Operatives
 Capucine – French model and actress
 William Holden – American actor
 Susannah York – English actress
 T.K. Critchley – Australian High Commissioner
 Maj. Gen. Sher Ali Khan Pataudi – Pakistani High Commissioner

Candidates 
24 delegates competed at Miss Malaysia 1963.

 Alice Woon, 17, Singapore
 Annabella Solomon, Kuala Lumpur
 Anita Chee, 21, Kluang
 Ann Woodford, 20, Singapore
 Carmen Smith, Kuala Lumpur
 Catherine Loh, 19, Brunei
 Diana Yong, Kuala Lumpur
 Fanny Voon, Jesselton
 Helen Lee Yoke Lin, 22, Kuala Lumpur
 Ho Nyuk Bitt, Jesselton
 Linda Foo, 20, Singapore
 Linda Tong, Kuala Lumpur
 Maria Abdulla, Singapore
 Molly Lan, Sandakan
 Molly Low, Singapore
 Mona Bird, Kuala Lumpur
 N. Selvarani, Rawang
 Olga Cornelius, Singapore
 Patricia Chan, Singapore
 Pixie Monteiro, Singapore
 Sara Abdullah, Kuala Lumpur
 Shirley Andre, Kuala Lumpur
 Susan Chiew, Ipoh
 S. Pushparani, Kuala Lumpur

Crossovers 
Contestants who previously competed/appeared at other international/national beauty pageants:
National competition

Miss Malaya International
 1961 – Ann Woodford (1st Runner-Up)

State competition

Miss Melaka International
 1961 – Ann Woodford (1st Runner-Up)

Miss Kuala Lumpur International
 1962 – Ann Woodford (2nd Runner-Up)

Miss Brunei
 1961 – Catherine Loh (Winner)
 1962 – Catherine Loh (Winner)

Miss Kebaya
 1962 – Catherine Loh (Winner)

Miss Varsity Queen Singapore
 1963 – Alice Woon (Winner)

References 

1963
1963 beauty pageants
1963 in Malaysia
Miss World